Colin Irwin (born 9 February 1957) is a professional footballer of the early 1980s.

A defender, able to play at left-back or in the centre, Irwin came through the youth ranks at Liverpool, and his first call-up to the first-team squad came, remarkably, in the 1978 European Cup Final. Irwin did not get on the pitch, but Liverpool won the game, and Irwin collected a winners medal.

He was not involved in the first-team squad for all the 1978–79 season, but he made his debut early the following season, against West Bromwich Albion, and went on to make 14 appearances throughout the season.

1980–81 saw a revamp of the Liverpool squad, with many young players given their chance, including Irwin. Although not an automatic first-team selection, he made 30 appearances and was a regular squad member as Liverpool won the League Cup and European Cup.

The summer of 1981 saw Liverpool sign Mark Lawrenson, Irwin was made surplus, and he and other players released by Liverpool moved on to Swansea, managed by John Toshack, for £340,000. This was the club's record transfer paid. Much of it was still owing when the club went bankrupt in 1984, and settled in when they paid out £400,000 for Ashley Williams. He was made captain, but suffered a knee injury in 1983 which forced him to retire.

Following retirement, he served as a coach at Bolton Wanderers, under former teammate Phil Neal, from 1985-87.

Honours
 European Cup: 1978, 1981
 Charity Shield: 1980
 Football League Cup: 1981
 Welsh Cup: 1982, 1983

References

External links
 Liverpool FC profile
 Profile at LFCHistory.net

1957 births
Living people
English footballers
Association football defenders
Liverpool F.C. players
Swansea City A.F.C. players
Bolton Wanderers F.C. non-playing staff
Footballers from Liverpool
UEFA Champions League winning players